The minister of Finance is a minister in the Cabinet of South Africa who is the political head of the National Treasury. The minister of Finance is responsible for the financial management of government affairs, drawing up the budget, and developing economic policy (in cooperation with the minister of Economic Development and the minister of Trade and Industry). The minister of Finance is also responsible for the South African Revenue Service.

List, 1910–present

References

External links
Official website

Finance

Lists of political office-holders in South Africa